Karayün is a village in the Batman District of Batman Province in Turkey. The village is populated by Kurds of the Receban tribe and had a population of 1,025 in 2021.

The hamlet of Okçu is attached to the village and is also populated by the Receban tribe.

References 

Villages in Batman District
Kurdish settlements in Batman Province